Margo Cathleen Harshman (born March 4, 1986) is an American actress known for the roles of series regular Tawny Dean on Even Stevens, Sheldon Cooper's assistant Alex Jensen on The Big Bang Theory, and Timothy McGee's wife Delilah Fielding-McGee on NCIS.

Early life and family 
Margo Harshman was born in San Diego, California, to Janelle and David.  She has two older sisters, an older brother and a younger brother. She's related to former baseball pitcher Jack Harshman and former University of Washington and Washington State University basketball coach Marv Harshman. 

Harshman lived in La Costa, San Diego County, California and attended school there until she was 12, after which she moved to Orange County, California. There she finished the rest of her education, first at Hewes Middle School and then at Foothill High School. In August 2002, she became a freshman in Community College.

Career 
Harshman's grandmother entered her in a beauty pageant at the age of two. 

In 2000 she was cast in the Disney Channel sitcom Even Stevens as Tawny Dean, the female best friend of series lead Louis. Harshman appeared in 47 episodes in the show's three-year run and reprised the role for the 2003 movie. Beginning in 2012 she appeared in The Big Bang Theory as Alex Jensen, the assistant of Sheldon Cooper, and the following year debuted in the long-running series NCIS as Delilah Fielding, the wheelchair user wife of Timothy McGee who works as an intelligence analyst at the US Department of Defense. Harshman starred on the short-lived TV shows Run of the House and Center of the Universe. Her film appearances include Sorority Row and College Road Trip and Fired Up!

Personal life 
Harshman dated her Even Stevens co-star Shia Labeouf while they were working on the show together. She married Austin Hooks in 2017, but the couple filed for divorce on November 29, 2018, after an eight week long separation. Harshman now lives in Los Angeles.

Awards and nominations 
In 2005, Harshman was nominated for two awards at the Young Artist Awards, one for Best Performance in a TV Movie, Miniseries or Special by a Supporting Young Actress for The Even Stevens Movie (2004) (TV) and the other for Best Performance in a TV Series (Comedy or Drama) by a Supporting Young Actress for Even Stevens (2001). In 2009, Harshman won the ShoWest "Female Stars of Tomorrow" award at the ShoWest Convention along with fellow Sorority Row cast members Briana Evigan, Leah Pipes, Rumer Willis, Jamie Chung and Audrina Patridge.

Filmography

Film

Television

Music videos

References

External links 

 

1986 births
20th-century American actresses
21st-century American actresses
Actresses from San Diego
American child actresses
American film actresses
American television actresses
Living people
People from Carlsbad, California